Eudonia perinetensis is a species of moth in the family Crambidae. It is primarily located in Madagascar.  It was described by Patrice J.A. Leraut in 1989.

References

Moths described in 1989
Eudonia